Niditinea orleansella is a species of clothes moth in the family Tineidae.

The MONA or Hodges number for Niditinea orleansella is 0412.

References

Further reading

External links

 

Tineinae
Moths described in 1873